This is a list of nature centers and environmental education centers in the state of Oregon. 

To use the sortable tables: click on the icons at the top of each column to sort that column in alphabetical order; click again for reverse alphabetical order.

References
 Environmental Education Association of Oregon

External links

 Map of nature centers and environmental education centers in Oregon

 
Nature centers
Oregon